The 27th Acrobatic Gymnastics European Championships was held in Riesa, Germany  from September 23 to October 5, 2015.

Results

Medal table

References

External links
 
 2015 European Championships in Acrobatic Gymnastics at European Gymnastics

European Acrobatics Championships
2015 in gymnastics
2015 in German sport
Euro